Alessandro Giannessi was the defending champion but chose not to defend his title.

Andrea Pellegrino won the title after defeating Andrea Collarini 6–1, 6–4 in the final.

Seeds

Draw

Finals

Top half

Bottom half

References

External links
Main draw
Qualifying draw

Internazionali di Tennis Città di Vicenza - 1
2022 Singles